Lauren Selig is an American film producer, businesswoman, writer and philanthropist. She is co-founder of Shake and Bake Productions, VALIS Virtual Reality, Curiosity Ink and Tangled Little Dragon. She is a venture partner at Bold Capital Partners and an advisor to Build A Rocket Boy and XPrize.

Early life and education
Selig was born in Seattle, Washington, the daughter of billionaire property developer Martin Selig.  Her mother is Andrea (née Fain). Selig has an older brother and a younger sister.

During elementary school and high school Selig attended the private Lakeside School and Phillips Exeter Academy and went on to her undergraduate studies at Georgetown University where she earned a BS in International Relations.  She studied for a year at the London School of Economics while working at Variety. Selig then went on to the University of Washington and Northwestern University where she earned a JD-MBA.

Career
After writing for Variety magazine, Selig worked as story editor in 1997 at DreamWorks for producer Mark Johnson.  In 2000 she practiced international licensing for music company Playnetworks.

From 2002, Selig worked at Microsoft in Platforms Business Development. She began working in the family business, and from 2003 to 2012 Selig was Director of Development at her family's company, Martin Selig Real Estate. She also managed the private family investments in startups and organized the family's philanthropic giving.

In 2005, Selig started Lala Laptop, a line of women's laptop bags; profits from the bag sales were donated to charity. In 2009 she wrote and created a selection of children's books and children's iPhone applications called Little Lala.  At that time Selig was the president of Business Development and strategy at the online movie service company IndieFlix.

Selig co-founded Shake and Bake Productions. Her recent movies include the Elton John biopic Rocketman and the Sam Raimi thriller Crawl.  Selig was executive producer of Hacksaw Ridge, Lone Survivor, Everest, American Made, A Walk Among the Tombstones, and I Am Michael, which screened at the Sundance Film Festival in 2015. That year she was named as one of Variety magazine's "producers to watch".

In 2017, Hacksaw Ridge, executive-produced by Selig, received six Oscar nominations.

She is currently producing the last Stanley Kubrick script The Downslope, the sci-fi masterpiece The Diamond Age and the Amazon series Wheel of Time.

In addition to her work in film and television she advises companies on their investments into the United States and is a partner at the virtual reality company V.A.L.I.S. which won an Emmy for its work on Capturing Everest. VALIS produced the TIME recreation of Martin Luther King. She was an advisor to the IMAX fund and worked with several crypto currency companies through her fund Tangled Little Dragon.

Selig is an early investor in several companies including Galaxy Interactive, A16z, Vaxxinity, Bulletproof Coffee, 1UP Ventures, SALT, Limeade, Deviation Games, Build A Rocket Boy, Wax Exchange, Otoy, Pantera and Hashgraph.

She produces live entertainment through her partnership with Poets Road and is an advisor to Peter Jackson's company WETA. She is an ambassador to Reefline, and serves on the board of X-Prize.

Personal life
Selig lives in Los Angeles. Her husband Kyril Faenov, General Manager of the SQL Test Group at Microsoft Corporation, killed himself in  2012.

References

External links

Shake And Bake Productions

Year of birth missing (living people)
Living people
Alumni of the London School of Economics
Phillips Exeter Academy alumni
Georgetown University alumni
Northwestern University alumni
University of Washington alumni
Lakeside School alumni
Filmmakers from Seattle
American women film producers
American children's writers
21st-century American women writers
Writers from Seattle
Microsoft employees
Film producers from Washington (state)